Let Me Do One More is the second studio album by American indie rock band Illuminati Hotties. It was released under Hopeless Records and co-released under the band's own imprint label, Snack Shack Tracks  on October 1, 2021. The album features collaborations from Alex Menne, the singer of Great Grandpa and Buck Meek, the guitarist of Big Thief. The album was mostly written before the band's last release, Free I.H: This Is Not the One You've Been Waiting For.

Background
Let Me Do One More was largely written before the band's last mixtape, Free I.H: This Is Not the One You've Been Waiting For. Free I.H: This Is Not the One You've Been Waiting For signals the band's departure from the record label Tiny Engines due to the financial controversy between the record label and several of its artists. The New York Times reported that because Sarah Tudzin, the bandleader of Illuminati Hotties, did not want Let Me Do One More "to arrive on the embattled label [Tiny Engines]", she wrote the mixtape, Free I.H: This Is Not the One You've Been Waiting For to complete a contractual agreement with the label. Let Me Do One More was released under Hopeless Records and the band's own label, Snack Shack Tracks, which was first launched during the release of "Mmmoooaaaaayaya", the album's first single.

Reception

At Metacritic, which assigns a normalized rating out of 100 to reviews from professional publications, Let Me Do One More received an average score of 87, based on 12 reviews, indicating "universal acclaim". Alex Hudson of Exclaim! called the album "12 songs of impeccably crafted pop hooks, hyperactive crescendos and graceful comedowns".

Accolades

Track listing

References 

2021 albums
Rock albums by American artists
Hopeless Records albums